Jordan Bennett (born Jordan Bennett Suffin) is an American actor, singer, writer and songwriter.

Biography
Bennett began his career in the Catskill Mountains in upstate New York as a singer and comedian. While there, he worked with such performers as Red Buttons and Milton Berle. He then went on to Broadway where he costarred with John Cullum in the musical Shenandoah. Bennett also starred on Broadway as Cyrano de Bergerac in Cyrano The Musical.

In Los Angeles, Bennett starred as Jean Valjean in the original L.A. production of Les Misérables.

On television, Bennett has had recurring roles in The Waltons, Too Close For Comfort and Emergency. He starred in the cult classic B-film, Ninja III: The Domination. He also appears in the Carl Reiner film, Bert Rigby You're A Fool.

In 2015, Bennett released a CD of original songs titled Original. One of the songs, She's Got Me, was written with 10 time Grammy winner Eddie Palmieri

Currently, Jordan Bennett tours the world doing his acclaimed one man show, The FeelGood Concert In addition, he performs The BFF Show with actor Robert Picardo

Personal life
Bennett is Jewish and serves as a cantor at the Temple Shalom for the Arts.

References

External links
 Official website
 

Living people
American male stage actors
Jewish American male actors
Jewish American musicians
1963 births
21st-century American Jews